Grigny is a commune in the southern suburbs of Paris, France.

Population

Transportation
Grigny is served by Grigny-Centre station on Paris RER line D.

Avenue des Sablons 
The Avenue des Sablons, about 10 km long, is the main thoroughfare of Grigny, a small town in the suburbs of Paris. A new town, developed in the 1970s, Grigny has been the target of massive investment in house construction. The Avenue des Sablons, as the town's main street, gives access to about 4,000 residential properties, and construction is still in progress. Many estate agents and letting agents are located here because of the great potential of the area.
It is located in the district of Grigny 2.

Crime
The city has one of the highest rates of poverty and crime in the Essonne. There have been riots, particularly in the area of the Grande Borne. There were overnight clashes in Grigny on 6–7 November 2005, which left 10 police injured, two seriously.

On 8 July 2016, police investigated a burned car and were greeted by several bowling balls, glass bottles and stones thrown from towers. Five policemen were wounded by the missile throwing and it took reinforcements of the National Gendarmerie to restore calm.

On 28 May 2016, a police car was destroyed and two police officers were injured in clashes with over one hundred youths. Some thirty people armed with stones, bottles and iron bars forced a police patrol to turn back and were later joined by 70 others. A single person was arrested.

Notable people
Amedy Coulibaly, one of three perpetrators of the January 2015 Île-de-France attacks
Pierre-Paul Lemercier de La Rivière de Saint-Médard (1719-1801)
Sandrine Bonnaire, actress
Ronisia, singer

See also
Communes of the Essonne department

References

External links

Official website 

 GIP de Grigny et de Viry-Châtillon: official website 
Mayors of Essonne Association 

Communes of Essonne